Chinese (especially when referring to written Chinese) is a group of languages spoken natively by the ethnic Han Chinese majority and many minority ethnic groups in Greater China. About 1.3 billion people (or approximately 16% of the world's population) speak a variety of Chinese as their first language.

Chinese languages form the Sinitic branch of the Sino-Tibetan languages family. The spoken varieties of Chinese are usually considered by native speakers to be dialects of a single language. However, their lack of mutual intelligibility means they are sometimes considered to be separate languages in a family. Investigation of the historical relationships among the varieties of Chinese is ongoing. Currently, most classifications posit 7 to 13 main regional groups based on phonetic developments from Middle Chinese, of which the most spoken by far is Mandarin (with about 800 million speakers, or 66%), followed by Min (75 million, e.g. Southern Min), Wu (74 million, e.g. Shanghainese), and Yue (68 million, e.g. Cantonese). These branches are unintelligible to each other, and many of their subgroups are unintelligible with the other varieties within the same branch (e.g. Southern Min). There are, however, transitional areas where varieties from different branches share enough features for some limited intelligibility, including New Xiang with Southwest Mandarin, Xuanzhou Wu with Lower Yangtze Mandarin, Jin with Central Plains Mandarin and certain divergent dialects of Hakka with Gan (though these are unintelligible with mainstream Hakka). All varieties of Chinese are tonal to at least some degree, and are largely analytic.

The earliest Chinese written records are Shang dynasty-era oracle bone inscriptions, which can be dated to 1250 BCE. The phonetic categories of Old Chinese can be reconstructed from the rhymes of ancient poetry. During the Northern and Southern dynasties period, Middle Chinese went through several sound changes and split into several varieties following prolonged geographic and political separation. Qieyun, a rime dictionary, recorded a compromise between the pronunciations of different regions. The royal courts of the Ming and early Qing dynasties operated using a koiné language (Guanhua) based on Nanjing dialect of Lower Yangtze Mandarin.

Standard Chinese (Standard Mandarin), based on the Beijing dialect of Mandarin, was adopted in the 1930s and is now an official language of both the People's Republic of China and the Republic of China (Taiwan), one of the four official languages of Singapore, and one of the six official languages of the United Nations. The written form, using the logograms known as Chinese characters, is shared by literate speakers of mutually unintelligible dialects. Since the 1950s, simplified Chinese characters have been promoted for use by the government of the People's Republic of China, while Singapore officially adopted simplified characters in 1976. Traditional characters remain in use in Taiwan, Hong Kong, Macau, and other countries with significant overseas Chinese speaking communities such as Malaysia (which although adopted simplified characters as the de facto standard in the 1980s, traditional characters still remain in widespread use).

Classification

Linguists classify all varieties of Chinese as part of the Sino-Tibetan language family, together with Burmese, Tibetan and many other languages spoken in the Himalayas and the Southeast Asian Massif. Although the relationship was first proposed in the early 19th century and is now broadly accepted, reconstruction of Sino-Tibetan is much less developed than that of families such as Indo-European or Austroasiatic. Difficulties have included the great diversity of the languages, the lack of inflection in many of them, and the effects of language contact. In addition, many of the smaller languages are spoken in mountainous areas that are difficult to reach and are often also sensitive border zones. Without a secure reconstruction of proto-Sino-Tibetan, the higher-level structure of the family remains unclear. A top-level branching into Chinese and Tibeto-Burman languages is often assumed, but has not been convincingly demonstrated.

History

The first written records appeared over 3,000 years ago during the Shang dynasty. As the language evolved over this period, the various local varieties became mutually unintelligible. In reaction, central governments have repeatedly sought to promulgate a unified standard.

Old and Middle Chinese
The earliest examples of Chinese (Old Chinese) are divinatory inscriptions on oracle bones from around 1250 BCE in the late Shang dynasty. The next attested stage came from  inscriptions on bronze artifacts of the Western Zhou period (1046–771 BCE), the Classic of Poetry and portions of the Book of Documents and I Ching. Scholars have attempted to reconstruct the phonology of Old Chinese by comparing later varieties of Chinese with the rhyming practice of the Classic of Poetry and the phonetic elements found in the majority of Chinese characters. Although many of the finer details remain unclear, most scholars agree that Old Chinese differs from Middle Chinese in lacking retroflex and palatal obstruents but having initial consonant clusters of some sort, and in having voiceless nasals and liquids. Most recent reconstructions also describe an atonal language with consonant clusters at the end of the syllable, developing into tone distinctions in Middle Chinese.  Several derivational affixes have also been identified, but the language lacks inflection, and indicated grammatical relationships using word order and grammatical particles.

Middle Chinese was the language used during Northern and Southern dynasties and the Sui, Tang, and Song dynasties (6th through 10th centuries CE). It can be divided into an early period, reflected by the Qieyun rime book (601 CE), and a late period in the 10th century, reflected by rhyme tables such as the Yunjing constructed by ancient Chinese philologists as a guide to the Qieyun system. These works define phonological categories, but with little hint of what sounds they represent. Linguists have identified these sounds by comparing the categories with pronunciations in modern varieties of Chinese, borrowed Chinese words in Japanese, Vietnamese, and Korean, and transcription evidence. The resulting system is very complex, with a large number of consonants and vowels, but they are probably not all distinguished in any single dialect. Most linguists now believe it represents a diasystem encompassing 6th-century northern and southern standards for reading the classics.

Classical and literary forms

The relationship between spoken and written Chinese is rather complex ("diglossia"). Its spoken varieties have evolved at different rates, while written Chinese itself has changed much less. Classical Chinese literature began in the Spring and Autumn period.

Rise of northern dialects
After the fall of the Northern Song dynasty and subsequent reign of the Jin (Jurchen) and Yuan (Mongol) dynasties in northern China, a common speech (now called Old Mandarin) developed based on the dialects of the North China Plain around the capital.
The Zhongyuan Yinyun (1324) was a dictionary that codified the rhyming conventions of new sanqu verse form in this language.
Together with the slightly later Menggu Ziyun, this dictionary describes a language with many of the features characteristic of modern Mandarin dialects.

Up to the early 20th century, most Chinese people only spoke their local variety.
Thus, as a practical measure, officials of the Ming and Qing dynasties carried out the administration of the empire using a common language based on Mandarin varieties, known as Guānhuà (/, literally "language of officials").
For most of this period, this language was a koiné based on dialects spoken in the Nanjing area, though not identical to any single dialect.
By the middle of the 19th century, the Beijing dialect had become dominant and was essential for any business with the imperial court.

In the 1930s, a standard national language, Guóyǔ (/ ; "national language") was adopted. After much dispute between proponents of northern and southern dialects and an abortive attempt at an artificial pronunciation, the National Language Unification Commission finally settled on the Beijing dialect in 1932. The People's Republic founded in 1949 retained this standard but renamed it pǔtōnghuà (/; "common speech"). The national language is now used in education, the media, and formal situations in both Mainland China and Taiwan. Because of their colonial and linguistic history, the language used in education, the media, formal speech, and everyday life in Hong Kong and Macau is the local Cantonese, although the standard language, Mandarin, has become very influential and is being taught in schools.

Influence

Historically, the Chinese language has spread to its neighbors through a variety of means. Northern Vietnam was incorporated into the Han empire in 111 BCE, marking the beginning of a period of Chinese control that ran almost continuously for a millennium. The Four Commanderies were established in northern Korea in the first century BCE, but disintegrated in the following centuries. Chinese Buddhism spread over East Asia between the 2nd and 5th centuries CE, and with it the study of scriptures and literature in Literary Chinese. Later Korea, Japan, and Vietnam developed strong central governments modeled on Chinese institutions, with Literary Chinese as the language of administration and scholarship, a position it would retain until the late 19th century in Korea and (to a lesser extent) Japan, and the early 20th century in Vietnam. Scholars from different lands could communicate, albeit only in writing, using Literary Chinese.

Although they used Chinese solely for written communication, each country had its own tradition of reading texts aloud, the so-called Sino-Xenic pronunciations. Chinese words with these pronunciations were also extensively imported into the Korean, Japanese and Vietnamese languages, and today comprise over half of their vocabularies. This massive influx led to changes in the phonological structure of the languages, contributing to the development of moraic structure in Japanese and the disruption of vowel harmony in Korean.

Borrowed Chinese morphemes have been used extensively in all these languages to coin compound words for new concepts, in a similar way to the use of Latin and Ancient Greek roots in European languages. Many new compounds, or new meanings for old phrases, were created in the late 19th and early 20th centuries to name Western concepts and artifacts. These coinages, written in shared Chinese characters, have then been borrowed freely between languages. They have even been accepted into Chinese, a language usually resistant to loanwords, because their foreign origin was hidden by their written form. Often different compounds for the same concept were in circulation for some time before a winner emerged, and sometimes the final choice differed between countries. The proportion of vocabulary of Chinese origin thus tends to be greater in technical, abstract, or formal language. For example, in Japan, Sino-Japanese words account for about 35% of the words in entertainment magazines, over half the words in newspapers, and 60% of the words in science magazines.

Vietnam, Korea, and Japan each developed writing systems for their own languages, initially based on Chinese characters, but later replaced with the hangul alphabet for Korean and supplemented with kana syllabaries for Japanese, while Vietnamese continued to be written with the complex chữ nôm script. However, these were limited to popular literature until the late 19th century. Today Japanese is written with a composite script using both Chinese characters (kanji) and kana. Korean is written exclusively with hangul in North Korea (although knowledge of the supplementary Chinese characters - hanja - is still required), and hanja are increasingly rarely used in South Korea. As a result of former French colonization, Vietnamese switched to a Latin-based alphabet.

Examples of loan words in English include "tea", from Hokkien (Min Nan) , "dim sum", from Cantonese dim2 sam1 and "kumquat", from Cantonese gam1gwat1.

Varieties

Jerry Norman estimated that there are hundreds of mutually unintelligible varieties of Chinese. These varieties form a dialect continuum, in which differences in speech generally become more pronounced as distances increase, though the rate of change varies immensely. Generally, mountainous South China exhibits more linguistic diversity than the North China Plain. In parts of South China, a major city's dialect may only be marginally intelligible to close neighbors. In parts of Fujian the speech of neighboring counties or even villages may be mutually unintelligible.

Until the late 20th century, Chinese emigrants to Southeast Asia and North America came from southeast coastal areas, where Min, Hakka, and Yue dialects are spoken.
The vast majority of Chinese immigrants to North America up to the mid-20th century spoke the Taishan dialect, from a small coastal area southwest of Guangzhou.

Grouping

Local varieties of Chinese are conventionally classified into seven dialect groups, largely on the basis of the different evolution of Middle Chinese voiced initials:
 Mandarin, including Standard Chinese, Pekingese, Sichuanese, and also the Dungan language spoken in Central Asia
 Wu, including Shanghainese, Suzhounese, and Wenzhounese
 Gan
 Xiang
 Min, including Fuzhounese, Hainanese, Hokkien and Teochew
 Hakka
 Yue, including Cantonese and Taishanese

The classification of Li Rong, which is used in the Language Atlas of China (1987), distinguishes three further groups:
 Jin, previously included in Mandarin.
 Huizhou, previously included in Wu.
 Pinghua, previously included in Yue.

Some varieties remain unclassified, including Danzhou dialect (spoken in Danzhou, on Hainan Island), Waxianghua (spoken in western Hunan) and Shaozhou Tuhua (spoken in northern Guangdong).

Standard Chinese

Standard Chinese, often called Mandarin, is the official standard language of China, the de facto official language of Taiwan, and one of the four official languages of Singapore (where it is called "Huáyŭ" / or Chinese). Standard Chinese is based on the Beijing dialect, the dialect of Mandarin as spoken in Beijing. The governments of both China and Taiwan intend for speakers of all Chinese speech varieties to use it as a common language of communication. Therefore, it is used in government agencies, in the media, and as a language of instruction in schools.

In China and Taiwan, diglossia has been a common feature. For example, in addition to Standard Chinese, a resident of Shanghai might speak Shanghainese; and, if they grew up elsewhere, then they are also likely to be fluent in the particular dialect of that local area. A native of Guangzhou may speak both Cantonese and Standard Chinese. In addition to Mandarin, most Taiwanese also speak Taiwanese Hokkien (commonly "Taiwanese" ), Hakka, or an Austronesian language. A Taiwanese may commonly mix pronunciations, phrases, and words from Mandarin and other Taiwanese languages, and this mixture is considered normal in daily or informal speech.

Due to their traditional cultural ties to Guangdong province and colonial histories, Cantonese is used as the standard variant of Chinese in Hong Kong and Macau instead.

Nomenclature
The official Chinese designation for the major branches of Chinese is fāngyán (literally "regional speech"), whereas the more closely related varieties within these are called dìdiǎn fāngyán (/ "local speech"). Conventional English-language usage in Chinese linguistics is to use dialect for the speech of a particular place (regardless of status) and dialect group for a regional grouping such as Mandarin or Wu. Because varieties from different groups are not mutually intelligible, some scholars prefer to describe Wu and others as separate languages. Jerry Norman called this practice misleading, pointing out that Wu, which itself contains many mutually unintelligible varieties, could not be properly called a single language under the same criterion, and that the same is true for each of the other groups.

Mutual intelligibility is considered by some linguists to be the main criterion for determining whether varieties are separate languages or dialects of a single language, although others do not regard it as decisive, particularly when cultural factors interfere as they do with Chinese. As  explains, linguists often ignore mutual intelligibility when varieties share intelligibility with a central variety (i.e. prestige variety, such as Standard Mandarin), as the issue requires some careful handling when mutual intelligibility is inconsistent with language identity. John DeFrancis argues that it is inappropriate to refer to Mandarin, Wu and so on as "dialects" because the mutual unintelligibility between them is too great. On the other hand, he also objects to considering them as separate languages, as it incorrectly implies a set of disruptive "religious, economic, political, and other differences" between speakers that exist, for example, between French Catholics and English Protestants in Canada, but not between speakers of Cantonese and Mandarin in China, owing to China's near-uninterrupted history of centralized government.

Because of the difficulties involved in determining the difference between language and dialect, other terms have been proposed. These include vernacular, lect, regionalect, topolect, and variety.

Most Chinese people consider the spoken varieties as one single language because speakers share a common culture and history, as well as a shared national identity and a common written form.

Phonology

Syllables in the Chinese languages have some unique characteristics. They are tightly related to the morphology and also to the characters of the writing system; and phonologically they are structured according to fixed rules.

The structure of each syllable consists of a nucleus that has a vowel (which can be a monophthong, diphthong, or even a triphthong in certain varieties), preceded by an onset (a single consonant, or consonant+glide; zero onset is also possible), and followed (optionally) by a coda consonant; a syllable also carries a tone. There are some instances where a vowel is not used as a nucleus. An example of this is in Cantonese, where the nasal sonorant consonants  and  can stand alone as their own syllable.

The number of sounds in the different spoken dialects varies, but in general there has been a tendency to a reduction in sounds from Middle Chinese. The Mandarin dialects in particular have experienced a dramatic decrease in sounds and so have far more multisyllabic words than most other spoken varieties. The total number of syllables in some varieties is therefore only about a thousand, including tonal variation, which is only about an eighth as many as English.

Tones
All varieties of spoken Chinese use tones to distinguish words. A few dialects of north China may have as few as three tones, while some dialects in south China have up to 6 or 12 tones, depending on how one counts. One exception from this is Shanghainese which has reduced the set of tones to a two-toned pitch accent system much like modern Japanese.

A very common example used to illustrate the use of tones in Chinese is the application of the four tones of Standard Chinese (along with the neutral tone) to the syllable ma. The tones are exemplified by the following five Chinese words:

Standard Cantonese, in contrast, has six tones. Historically, finals that end in a stop consonant were considered to be "checked tones" and thus counted separately for a total of nine tones. However, they are considered to be duplicates in modern linguistics and are no longer counted as such:

Grammar

Chinese is often described as a "monosyllabic" language. However, this is only partially correct. It is largely accurate when describing Classical Chinese and Middle Chinese; in Classical Chinese, for example, perhaps 90% of words correspond to a single syllable and a single character. In the modern varieties, it is usually the case that a morpheme (unit of meaning) is a single syllable; in contrast, English has many multi-syllable morphemes, both bound and free, such as "seven", "elephant", "para-" and "-able".

Some of the conservative southern varieties of modern Chinese have largely monosyllabic words, especially among the more basic vocabulary. In modern Mandarin, however, most nouns, adjectives and verbs are largely disyllabic. A significant cause of this is phonological attrition. Sound change over time has steadily reduced the number of possible syllables. In modern Mandarin, there are now only about 1,200 possible syllables, including tonal distinctions, compared with about 5,000 in Vietnamese (still largely monosyllabic) and over 8,000 in English.

This phonological collapse has led to a corresponding increase in the number of homophones. As an example, the small Langenscheidt Pocket Chinese Dictionary lists six words that are commonly pronounced as shí (tone 2):  'ten'; / 'real, actual'; / 'know (a person), recognize';  'stone'; / 'time';  'food, eat'. They are still pronounced differently in today's Cantonese; in Jyutping they are sap9, sat9, sik7, sek9, si4, sik9. In modern spoken Mandarin, however, tremendous ambiguity would result if all of these words could be used as-is; Yuen Ren Chao's modern poem Lion-Eating Poet in the Stone Den exploits this, consisting of 92 characters all pronounced shi. As such, most of these words have been replaced (in speech, if not in writing) with a longer, less-ambiguous compound. Only the first one,  'ten', normally appears as such when spoken; the rest are normally replaced with, respectively, shíjì / (lit. 'actual-connection'); rènshi / (lit. 'recognize-know'); shítou / (lit. 'stone-head'); shíjiān / (lit. 'time-interval'); shíwù  (lit. 'foodstuff'). In each case, the homophone was disambiguated by adding another morpheme, typically either a synonym or a generic word of some sort (for example, 'head', 'thing'), the purpose of which is to indicate which of the possible meanings of the other, homophonic syllable should be selected.

However, when one of the above words forms part of a compound, the disambiguating syllable is generally dropped and the resulting word is still disyllabic. For example, shí  alone, not shítou /, appears in compounds meaning 'stone-', for example, shígāo  'plaster' (lit. 'stone cream'), shíhuī  'lime' (lit. 'stone dust'), shíkū  'grotto' (lit. 'stone cave'), shíyīng  'quartz' (lit. 'stone flower'), shíyóu  'petroleum' (lit. 'stone oil').

Most modern varieties of Chinese have the tendency to form new words through disyllabic, trisyllabic and tetra-character compounds. In some cases, monosyllabic words have become disyllabic without compounding, as in kūlong  from kǒng 孔; this is especially common in Jin.

Chinese morphology is strictly bound to a set number of syllables with a fairly rigid construction. Although many of these single-syllable morphemes (zì) can stand alone as individual words, they more often than not form multi-syllabic compounds, known as cí (/), which more closely resembles the traditional Western notion of a word. A Chinese cí ('word') can consist of more than one character-morpheme, usually two, but there can be three or more.

For example:
  / 'cloud'
 ,  /, / 'hamburger'
   'I, me'
  / 'goalkeeper'
   'people, human, mankind'
   'The Earth'
  / 'lightning'
  / 'dream'

All varieties of modern Chinese are analytic languages, in that they depend on syntax (word order and sentence structure) rather than morphology—i.e., changes in form of a word—to indicate the word's function in a sentence. In other words, Chinese has very few grammatical inflections—it possesses no tenses, no voices, no numbers (singular, plural; though there are plural markers, for example for personal pronouns), and only a few articles (i.e., equivalents to "the, a, an" in English).

They make heavy use of grammatical particles to indicate aspect and mood. In Mandarin Chinese, this involves the use of particles like le  (perfective), hái / ('still'), yǐjīng / ('already'), and so on.

Chinese has a subject–verb–object word order, and like many other languages of East Asia, makes frequent use of the topic–comment construction to form sentences. Chinese also has an extensive system of classifiers and measure words, another trait shared with neighboring languages like Japanese and Korean. Other notable grammatical features common to all the spoken varieties of Chinese include the use of serial verb construction, pronoun dropping and the related subject dropping.

Although the grammars of the spoken varieties share many traits, they do possess differences.

Vocabulary
The entire Chinese character corpus since antiquity comprises well over 50,000 characters, of which only roughly 10,000 are in use and only about 3,000 are frequently used in Chinese media and newspapers. However Chinese characters should not be confused with Chinese words. Because most Chinese words are made up of two or more characters, there are many more Chinese words than characters. A more accurate equivalent for a Chinese character is the morpheme, as characters represent the smallest grammatical units with individual meanings in the Chinese language.

Estimates of the total number of Chinese words and lexicalized phrases vary greatly. The Hanyu Da Zidian, a compendium of Chinese characters, includes 54,678 head entries for characters, including bone oracle versions. The Zhonghua Zihai (1994) contains 85,568 head entries for character definitions, and is the largest reference work based purely on character and its literary variants. The CC-CEDICT project (2010) contains 97,404 contemporary entries including idioms, technology terms and names of political figures, businesses and products. The 2009 version of the Webster's Digital Chinese Dictionary (WDCD), based on CC-CEDICT, contains over 84,000 entries.

The most comprehensive pure linguistic Chinese-language dictionary, the 12-volume Hanyu Da Cidian, records more than 23,000 head Chinese characters and gives over 370,000 definitions. The 1999 revised Cihai, a multi-volume encyclopedic dictionary reference work, gives 122,836 vocabulary entry definitions under 19,485 Chinese characters, including proper names, phrases and common zoological, geographical, sociological, scientific and technical terms.

The 7th (2016) edition of Xiandai Hanyu Cidian, an authoritative one-volume dictionary on modern standard Chinese language as used in mainland China, has 13,000 head characters and defines 70,000 words.

Loanwords
Like any other language, Chinese has absorbed a sizable number of loanwords from other cultures. Most Chinese words are formed out of native Chinese morphemes, including words describing imported objects and ideas. However, direct phonetic borrowing of foreign words has gone on since ancient times.

Some early Indo-European loanwords in Chinese have been proposed, notably  mì "honey", / shī "lion," and perhaps also / mǎ "horse", / zhū "pig",  quǎn "dog", and / é "goose".
Ancient words borrowed from along the Silk Road since Old Chinese include  pútáo "grape",  shíliu/shíliú "pomegranate" and / shīzi "lion". Some words were borrowed from Buddhist scriptures, including  Fó "Buddha" and / Púsà "bodhisattva." Other words came from nomadic peoples to the north, such as  hútòng "hutong". Words borrowed from the peoples along the Silk Road, such as  "grape," generally have Persian etymologies. Buddhist terminology is generally derived from Sanskrit or Pāli, the liturgical languages of North India. Words borrowed from the nomadic tribes of the Gobi, Mongolian or northeast regions generally have Altaic etymologies, such as  pípá, the Chinese lute, or  lào/luò "cheese" or "yogurt", but from exactly which source is not always clear.

Modern borrowings

Modern neologisms are primarily translated into Chinese in one of three ways: free translation (calque, or by meaning), phonetic translation (by sound), or a combination of the two. Today, it is much more common to use existing Chinese morphemes to coin new words to represent imported concepts, such as technical expressions and international scientific vocabulary. Any Latin or Greek etymologies are dropped and converted into the corresponding Chinese characters (for example, anti- typically becomes "", literally opposite), making them more comprehensible for Chinese but introducing more difficulties in understanding foreign texts. For example, the word telephone was initially loaned phonetically as / (Shanghainese: télífon , Mandarin: délǜfēng) during the 1920s and widely used in Shanghai, but later / diànhuà (lit. "electric speech"), built out of native Chinese morphemes, became prevalent ( is in fact from the Japanese  denwa; see below for more Japanese loans). Other examples include / diànshì (lit. "electric vision") for television, / diànnǎo (lit. "electric brain") for computer; / shǒujī (lit. "hand machine") for mobile phone, / lányá (lit. "blue tooth") for Bluetooth, and / wǎngzhì (lit. "internet logbook") for blog in Hong Kong and Macau Cantonese. Occasionally half-transliteration, half-translation compromises are accepted, such as / hànbǎobāo ( hànbǎo "Hamburg" +  bāo "bun") for "hamburger". Sometimes translations are designed so that they sound like the original while incorporating Chinese morphemes (phono-semantic matching), such as / Mǎlì'ào for the video game character Mario. This is often done for commercial purposes, for example / bēnténg (lit. "dashing-leaping") for Pentium and / Sàibǎiwèi (lit. "better-than hundred tastes") for Subway restaurants.

Foreign words, mainly proper nouns, continue to enter the Chinese language by transcription according to their pronunciations. This is done by employing Chinese characters with similar pronunciations. For example, "Israel" becomes  Yǐsèliè, "Paris" becomes  Bālí. A rather small number of direct transliterations have survived as common words, including / shāfā "sofa", / mǎdá "motor",  yōumò "humor", / luóji/luójí "logic", / shímáo "smart, fashionable", and  xiēsīdǐlǐ "hysterics". The bulk of these words were originally coined in the Shanghai dialect during the early 20th century and were later loaned into Mandarin, hence their pronunciations in Mandarin may be quite off from the English. For example, / "sofa" and / "motor" in Shanghainese sound more like their English counterparts. Cantonese differs from Mandarin with some transliterations, such as  so1 faa3*2 "sofa" and  mo1 daa2 "motor".

Western foreign words representing Western concepts have influenced Chinese since the 20th century through transcription. From French came  bālěi "ballet" and / xiāngbīn, "champagne"; from Italian,  kāfēi "caffè". English influence is particularly pronounced. From early 20th century Shanghainese, many English words are borrowed, such as / gāoěrfū "golf" and the above-mentioned / shāfā "sofa". Later, the United States soft influences gave rise to  dísikē/dísīkē "disco", / kělè "cola", and  mínǐ "mini [skirt]". Contemporary colloquial Cantonese has distinct loanwords from English, such as  kaa1 tung1 "cartoon",  gei1 lou2 "gay people",  dik1 si6*2 "taxi", and  baa1 si6*2 "bus". With the rising popularity of the Internet, there is a current vogue in China for coining English transliterations, for example, / fěnsī "fans",  hēikè "hacker" (lit. "black guest"), and  bókè "blog". In Taiwan, some of these transliterations are different, such as  hàikè for "hacker" and  bùluògé for "blog" (lit. "interconnected tribes").

Another result of the English influence on Chinese is the appearance in Modern Chinese texts of so-called / zìmǔcí (lit. "lettered words") spelled with letters from the English alphabet. This has appeared in magazines, newspapers, on web sites, and on TV: / "3rd generation cell phones" ( sān "three" + G "generation" + / shǒujī "mobile phones"),  "IT circles" (IT "information technology" +  jiè "industry"), HSK (Hànyǔ Shuǐpíng Kǎoshì, /), GB (Guóbiāo, /), / (CIF "Cost, Insurance, Freight" + / jià "price"),  "e-home" (e "electronic" +  jiātíng "home"), / "wireless era" (W "wireless" + / shídài "era"),  "TV watchers" (TV "television" +  zú "social group; clan"), / "post-PC era" (/ hòu "after/post-" + PC "personal computer" + /), and so on.

Since the 20th century, another source of words has been Japanese using existing kanji (Chinese characters used in Japanese). Japanese re-molded European concepts and inventions into , and many of these words have been re-loaned into modern Chinese. Other terms were coined by the Japanese by giving new senses to existing Chinese terms or by referring to expressions used in classical Chinese literature. For example, jīngjì (/;  keizai in Japanese), which in the original Chinese meant "the workings of the state", was narrowed to "economy" in Japanese; this narrowed definition was then reimported into Chinese. As a result, these terms are virtually indistinguishable from native Chinese words: indeed, there is some dispute over some of these terms as to whether the Japanese or Chinese coined them first. As a result of this loaning, Chinese, Korean, Japanese, and Vietnamese share a corpus of linguistic terms describing modern terminology, paralleling the similar corpus of terms built from Greco-Latin and shared among European languages.

Writing system

The Chinese orthography centers on Chinese characters, which are written within imaginary square blocks, traditionally arranged in vertical columns, read from top to bottom down a column, and right to left across columns, despite alternative arrangement with rows of characters from left to right within a row and from top to bottom across rows (like English and other Western writing systems) having become more popular since the 20th century. Chinese characters denote morphemes independent of phonetic variation in different languages. Thus the character  ("one") is uttered  in Standard Chinese,  in Cantonese and it in Hokkien (a form of Min).

Most written Chinese documents in the modern time, especially the more formal ones, are created using the grammar and syntax of the Standard Mandarin Chinese variants, regardless of dialectical background of the author or targeted audience. This replaced the old writing language standard of Literary Chinese before the 20th century. However, vocabularies from different Chinese-speaking areas have diverged, and the divergence can be observed in written Chinese.

Meanwhile, colloquial forms of various Chinese language variants have also been written down by their users, especially in less formal settings. The most prominent example of this is the written colloquial form of Cantonese, which has become quite popular in tabloids, instant messaging applications, and on the internet amongst Hong-Kongers and Cantonese-speakers elsewhere.

Because some Chinese variants have diverged and developed a number of unique morphemes that are not found in Standard Mandarin (despite all other common morphemes), unique characters rarely used in Standard Chinese have also been created or inherited from archaic literary standard to represent these unique morphemes.

The Chinese had no uniform phonetic transcription system for most of its speakers until the mid-20th century, although enunciation patterns were recorded in early rime books and dictionaries. Early Indian translators, working in Sanskrit and Pali, were the first to attempt to describe the sounds and enunciation patterns of Chinese in a foreign language. After the 15th century, the efforts of Jesuits and Western court missionaries resulted in some Latin character transcription/writing systems, based on various variants of Chinese languages. Some of these Latin character based systems are still being used to write various Chinese variants in the modern era.

In Hunan, women in certain areas write their local Chinese language variant in Nü Shu, a syllabary derived from Chinese characters. The Dungan language, considered by many a dialect of Mandarin, is nowadays written in Cyrillic, and was previously written in the Arabic script. The Dungan people are primarily Muslim and live mainly in Kazakhstan, Kyrgyzstan, and Russia; some of the related Hui people also speak the language and live mainly in China.

Chinese characters

Each Chinese character represents a monosyllabic Chinese word or morpheme. In 100 CE, the famed Han dynasty scholar Xu Shen classified characters into six categories, namely pictographs, simple ideographs, compound ideographs, phonetic loans, phonetic compounds and derivative characters. Of these, only 4% were categorized as pictographs, including many of the simplest characters, such as rén  (human), rì  (sun), shān  (mountain; hill), shuǐ  (water). Between 80% and 90% were classified as phonetic compounds such as chōng  (pour), combining a phonetic component zhōng  (middle) with a semantic radical  (water). Almost all characters created since have been made using this format. The 18th-century Kangxi Dictionary recognized 214 radicals.

Modern characters are styled after the regular script. Various other written styles are also used in Chinese calligraphy, including seal script, cursive script and clerical script. Calligraphy artists can write in traditional and simplified characters, but they tend to use traditional characters for traditional art.

There are currently two systems for Chinese characters. The traditional system, used in Hong Kong, Taiwan, Macau and Chinese speaking communities (except Singapore and Malaysia) outside mainland China, takes its form from standardized character forms dating back to the late Han dynasty. The Simplified Chinese character system, introduced by the People's Republic of China in 1954 to promote mass literacy, simplifies most complex traditional glyphs to fewer strokes, many to common cursive shorthand variants. Singapore, which has a large Chinese community, was the second nation to officially adopt simplified characters, although it has also become the de facto standard for younger ethnic Chinese in Malaysia.

The Internet provides the platform to practice reading these alternative systems, be it traditional or simplified. Most Chinese users in the modern era are capable of, although not necessarily comfortable with, reading (but not writing) the alternative system, through experience and guesswork.

A well-educated Chinese reader today recognizes approximately 4,000 to 6,000 characters; approximately 3,000 characters are required to read a Mainland newspaper. The PRC government defines literacy amongst workers as a knowledge of 2,000 characters, though this would be only functional literacy. School-children typically learn around 2,000 characters whereas scholars may memorize up to 10,000. A large unabridged dictionary, like the Kangxi Dictionary, contains over 40,000 characters, including obscure, variant, rare, and archaic characters; fewer than a quarter of these characters are now commonly used.

Romanization

Romanization is the process of transcribing a language into the Latin script. There are many systems of romanization for the Chinese varieties, due to the lack of a native phonetic transcription until modern times. Chinese is first known to have been written in Latin characters by Western Christian missionaries in the 16th century.

Today the most common romanization standard for Standard Mandarin is Hanyu Pinyin, introduced in 1956 by the People's Republic of China, and later adopted by Singapore and Taiwan. Pinyin is almost universally employed now for teaching standard spoken Chinese in schools and universities across the Americas, Australia, and Europe. Chinese parents also use Pinyin to teach their children the sounds and tones of new words. In school books that teach Chinese, the Pinyin romanization is often shown below a picture of the thing the word represents, with the Chinese character alongside.

The second-most common romanization system, the Wade–Giles, was invented by Thomas Wade in 1859 and modified by Herbert Giles in 1892. As this system approximates the phonology of Mandarin Chinese into English consonants and vowels, i.e. it is largely an Anglicization, it may be particularly helpful for beginner Chinese speakers of an English-speaking background. Wade–Giles was found in academic use in the United States, particularly before the 1980s, and until 2009 was widely used in Taiwan.

When used within European texts, the tone transcriptions in both pinyin and Wade–Giles are often left out for simplicity; Wade–Giles' extensive use of apostrophes is also usually omitted. Thus, most Western readers will be much more familiar with Beijing than they will be with Běijīng (pinyin), and with Taipei than T'ai²-pei³ (Wade–Giles). This simplification presents syllables as homophones which really are none, and therefore exaggerates the number of homophones almost by a factor of four.

Here are a few examples of Hanyu Pinyin and Wade–Giles, for comparison:

Other systems of romanization for Chinese include Gwoyeu Romatzyh, the French EFEO, the Yale system (invented during WWII for U.S. troops), as well as separate systems for Cantonese, Min Nan, Hakka, and other Chinese varieties.

Other phonetic transcriptions
Chinese varieties have been phonetically transcribed into many other writing systems over the centuries. The 'Phags-pa script, for example, has been very helpful in reconstructing the pronunciations of premodern forms of Chinese.

Zhuyin (colloquially bopomofo), a semi-syllabary is still widely used in Taiwan's elementary schools to aid standard pronunciation. Although zhuyin characters are reminiscent of katakana script, there is no source to substantiate the claim that Katakana was the basis for the zhuyin system. A comparison table of zhuyin to pinyin exists in the zhuyin article. Syllables based on pinyin and zhuyin can also be compared by looking at the following articles:
 Pinyin table
 Zhuyin table

There are also at least two systems of cyrillization for Chinese. The most widespread is the Palladius system.

As a foreign language

With the growing importance and influence of China's economy globally, Mandarin instruction has been gaining popularity in schools throughout East Asia, Southeast Asia, and the Western world.

Besides Mandarin, Cantonese is the only other Chinese language that is widely taught as a foreign language, largely due to the economic and cultural influence of Hong Kong and its widespread usage among significant Overseas Chinese communities.

In 1991 there were 2,000 foreign learners taking China's official Chinese Proficiency Test (also known as HSK, comparable to the English Cambridge Certificate), but by 2005 the number of candidates had risen sharply to 117,660  and in 2010 to 750,000.

See also 
 Chinese exclamative particles
 Chinese honorifics
 Chinese numerals
 Chinese punctuation
 Classical Chinese grammar
 Four-character idiom
 Han unification
 Languages of China
 North American Conference on Chinese Linguistics
 Protection of the Varieties of Chinese

Notes

References

Citations

Sources

Further reading 
 
 
 R. L. G. "Language borrowing Why so little Chinese in English?" The Economist. 6 June 2013.

External links 

 Classical Chinese texts – Chinese Text Project
 Marjorie Chan's ChinaLinks  at the Ohio State University with hundreds of links to Chinese related web pages

 
Analytic languages
Isolating languages
Language
Languages of China
Languages of Hong Kong
Languages of Macau
Languages of Singapore
Languages of Taiwan
Languages with own distinct writing systems
Lingua francas